The 2004 South American Under-19 Women's Football Championship was held in Encarnación, Paraguay (group A), Caracas, Venezuela (group B), Sucre, Bolivia (group C) and in Angra dos Reis, Brazil (Final round), from 11 to 29 May 2004. It was the first edition of the South American Youth Women's Championship and the only one with an age limit of 19 years. Team Brazil won this tournament and qualified for the 2004 FIFA U-19 Women's World Championship.

First round

Group A

Group B

Group C

Final round
Three group winners from the first round advanced to the final round. Team Brazil received a bye to this round.

References

2004
Women
International women's association football competitions hosted by Brazil
2004 in women's association football
2004 in Brazilian football
2004 in youth association football